Frederick "Fritz" Thurstone (1932–2005) was a pioneer in ultrasound technology, largely in the design of transducers for ultrasound imaging.

He earned a B.S. degree in Physics from the University of North Carolina at Chapel Hill in 1953 and M.S. and Ph.D degrees both in electrical engineering from North Carolina State University in 1957 and 1961 respectively.

References

 http://www.ob-ultrasound.net/history-realtime.html

1932 births
2005 deaths
Medical ultrasonography
American electrical engineers
University of North Carolina at Chapel Hill alumni
North Carolina State University alumni
Duke University faculty
20th-century American engineers